Lea Ann Miller (born January 22, 1961) is an American retired pair skater. With partner William Fauver, she is a three-time (1981, 1983–1984) U.S. silver medalist and the 1982 U.S. bronze medalist. They represented the United States at the 1984 Winter Olympics, where they placed 10th.

They turned professional following the Olympic season and toured professionally with Stars on Ice and Jayne Torvill / Christopher Dean's world tour.

Miller works as a choreographer and producer for skating shows, including Stars on Ice and many shows for television. Among the skaters she has choreographed for are
Katarina Witt, Yuka Sato, Rosalynn Sumners, Caryn Kadavy, Shen Xue / Zhao Hongbo,
Kimena Brog-Meier,
Tamar Katz,
and Katy Taylor.

Competitive highlights
(with Fauver)

References
Notes

Sources
 
 

1961 births
Living people
People from Kirkwood, Missouri
American female pair skaters
Figure skaters at the 1984 Winter Olympics
Olympic figure skaters of the United States
Figure skating choreographers
21st-century American women
20th-century American women